Acleris oxycoccana is a species of moth of the family Tortricidae. It is found in North America, where it has been recorded from Alberta, British Columbia, Indiana, Maine, Manitoba, Michigan, Minnesota, Newfoundland, Ontario, Pennsylvania, West Virginia and Wisconsin.

The wingspan is 13–15 mm. The colouration of the forewings is quite variable, ranging from uniform deep black-brown with scattered ruddy scaling to bright red-brown. Adults have been recorded on wing nearly year round.

The larvae feed on Chamaedaphne calyculata and Prunus pumila.

References

Moths described in 1869
oxycoccana
Moths of North America